Baanders is a Dutch occupational surname. "Baander" was a name for a ropemaker. Notable people of the name include the following:

Herman Hendrik Baanders (1849–1905), Dutch architect
Herman Ambrosius Jan Baanders (1876–1953), Dutch architect
Nina Baanders-Kessler (1915–2002), Dutch sculptor and medalist
Tine Baanders (1890–1971), Dutch illustrator and  graphic designer

References

Dutch-language surnames
Occupational surnames